Ivan Pešić may refer to:

Ivan Pešić (footballer, born 1989), Serbian footballer
Ivan Pešić (footballer, born 1992), Croatian footballer
Ivan Pešić (handballer) (born 1989), Croatian handball goalkeeper
Ivan Pesic (businessman), founder of Silvaco